Deus is a 1996 survival simulation game developed by Silmarils and published by ReadySoft. It is the sequel to Robinson's Requiem.

Story

The player again assumes the role of Robinson's Requiem protagonist Officer Trepliev, who has become a bounty hunter for the Alien World Exploration department and has to save a scientific research station from a group of terrorists called the New Crusaders.

Gameplay
Like Robinson's Requiem, the game features complex health monitoring and surgery systems; however, the game now contains an optional "action mode", which removes these systems.

Release 
Prior to its release on DOS and Windows, the game was originally in development for the Atari Jaguar CD under the working title Deus Ex Machina and was planned to be published around the fourth quarter of 1995, however, this early version was never released.

Reception
Deus critical reception was mixed. Computer Gaming World found the realism of the simulation mode to be overwhelming, and described the game's action mode as "dull". PC Gamer USs Scott Wolf said that the game's "[i]rritations [...] outweigh any enjoyment you might find". PC Gamer UK offered a dissenting opinion; despite calling the initial learning curve "alpine", the reviewer wrote, "After a while [...] Deus suddenly starts being fun. You begin to get the hang of the interface, and start to get into the plot".

References

External links 
 Deus at GameFAQs
 Deus at Giant Bomb
 Deus at MobyGames

1996 video games
Cancelled Atari Jaguar games
DOS games
ReadySoft Incorporated games
Silmarils (company) games
Survival video games
Video games developed in France
Video games scored by Fabrice Hautecloque
Windows games
Single-player video games